Superboy is a superhero that appears in American comic books published by DC Comics. The character was created by Jerry Siegel and Don Cameron and is based on the character of Superman that Siegel co-created with Joe Shuster. Superboy first appeared in the comic book More Fun Comics #101 in 1945.

Superboy is Superman in his preteen and teenage years. Most of his adventures take place in the fictional town of Smallville.

Publication history

The first pitch for a "Superboy" character was originally made by Superman co-creator Jerry Siegel (without fellow Superman co-creator Joe Shuster) in November 1938. The idea was turned down by Detective Comics, Inc., and the publisher again rejected a second pitch by Siegel two years later.

After the appeal of kid superheroes had been demonstrated by the success of Robin, the Boy Wonder and similar characters, Detective Comics reversed itself in late 1944 and started publishing a Superboy feature, in an effort to expand the Superman franchise by presenting a version of the character to whom younger readers could easily relate.

Superboy first appeared in More Fun Comics #101 (January/February 1945, published in late 1944). Though Joe Shuster supplied the art, the Superboy feature was published without the input or approval of Jerry Siegel, who was serving in World War II. This fact increased an already-growing rift between the publisher and Siegel and Shuster.

After just seven issues of More Fun Comics, the Superboy feature moved to Adventure Comics, where he debuted in issue #103 (1946) as the cover and lead feature for the anthology comic. In a period when the popularity of superheroes was generally in decline, the adventures of Superboy became increasingly popular.

Three years after the move to Adventure Comics, Superboy became only the sixth DC superhero to receive his own comic book when Superboy #1 debuted in 1949. Superboy became the first new superhero title to succeed since World War II.

The first Superboy story also updated the origin of Superman, and for the first time shows his father Jor-El as being aware that his son Kal-El would have powers on Earth that he does not have on Krypton. In this original story, years after his arrival on Earth, Clark Kent saves a man pinned under an automobile and subsequently decides to become the costumed hero Superboy. Clark appears to be a preteen in this story, and in his first story in Adventure Comics, he actually celebrates his tenth birthday.

In the first couple years of the Superboy feature, Superboy remained a boy close to that age. The character gradually aged, however, and by the time Superboy #1 was published, Superboy was usually depicted as being in his early teens.

Billed as "The Adventures of Superman When He Was a Boy", Superboy stories in both Adventure Comics and Superboy treat him as essentially a junior version of Superman. To that end, he wears the Superman costume and (beginning in More Fun Comics #107) his alter ego Clark Kent wears glasses as a disguise for his civilian identity. Superboy's powers are identical to those of Superman, including enhanced strength, speed, vision, and hearing, plus flight and invulnerability.

Though clearly superhero stories, Superboy's earliest adventures shared features with non-superhero comics of the late 1940s. For example, the three stories published in Superboy #1 had elements of teen romance, juvenile delinquency, and teen humor. In the words of Robert Greenberger, "No costumed super-villains plagued Smallville."

Not only are the earliest Superboy stories free of supervillains, Superboy himself is essentially earthbound and remains in the story "present." Not until 1949 does Superboy take a trip to the Moon, intercept a comet in outer space, and fly back in time to the American Revolutionary War.

Mythos and supporting cast

After the debut of the Superboy comic, Superboy's mythos and supporting cast expanded as well. His home town finally received a name, Smallville, in the second issue. The town's location was never specified, although it was usually placed close to Metropolis.

Superboy's foster parents, previously only Mr. and Mrs. Kent in their infrequent appearances in the Superboy feature, finally appeared on a cover (Superboy #3), began appearing more frequently in the stories, and received permanent first names, Jonathan in Adventure Comics #149 (1950) and Martha in Superboy #12 (1951).

Superboy #8 (1950) saw the first adventure of "Superbaby," a character which extends the "Junior Superman" concept to that of a super-powered toddler. The Superbaby stories are set in the time just after the Kents adopt Clark. Superboy #10 (1950) featured the first appearance of Lana Lang, a character that would become a romantic foil for both Superboy and the grown-up Superman. Lana's debut also featured her first attempt to learn Superboy's secret identity.

In Adventure Comics #210 (1955), Superboy acquires a superdog, Krypto, the first additional survivor of Krypton that he meets. Though Superboy regularly interacts with the Smallville police, Chief Douglas Parker, who first appears in Adventure Comics #225 (1956), is the first officer to become a regular supporting character.

Pete Ross first appears in Superboy #86 (1961) and quickly becomes Clark's best friend—and just four issues later, the guardian of his secret identity after accidentally finding it out while witnessing him changing into his costume. Bash Bashford, bully and a nemesis of Clark, became the last major addition to Clark's supporting cast with his debut in Superboy #157 (1969).

Early on, the Superboy feature became a platform for backdating first meetings between Superman and members of his supporting cast, nearly always contradicting previously established continuity. Thus, Superboy first meets Perry White in a 1947 story (Adventure Comics #120), and in the following year, meets Lois Lane (Adventure Comics #128), years after the adult Clark Kent had first met his fellow Daily Planet staffers in Superman stories. In a similar vein, Kal-El later meets toddler Jimmy Olsen (Adventure Comics #216, 1955) while still Superboy, as well as meeting a time traveling teenage Jimmy Olsen (Superboy #55, 1957).

Superman's first meetings with a number of his fellow superheroes were also backdated to his adolescence. Thus, Superboy meets Bruce Wayne (Batman) in World's Finest Comics #84 (1956) and on three subsequent occasions; Clark befriends short-term Smallville resident Oliver Queen (Green Arrow) in Adventure Comics #258 (1959); Superboy teams up with Aquaboy (Aquaman) to fight polluters in Superboy #171 (1971); Superboy meets Barbara Gordon (Batgirl) in Adventure Comics #453 (1977) and Clark befriends Hal Jordan (Green Lantern) in New Adventures of Superboy #13 (1981).

Time period of Superboy stories
The story about the first team-up between Superboy and Aquaboy was also the first story that occurred in a "floating timeline," with Superboy stories taking place perpetually 15 years or so behind the current year.

In the earliest stories, the time period in which Superboy's adventures were set was never clearly defined, with some adventures seemingly taking place in the same year the story was published. For example, in a 1952 story, Lana Lang participated in a "Miss Smallville of 1952" contest.

In the late 1950s, Superman comic editor Mort Weisinger decided to place all of Superboy's adventures in an early-to-mid-1930s setting, in light of Superman's first comic appearance being in 1938. In 1970, the Superboy writing staff decided to "update" Superboy by setting his book always about 15 years behind Superman.  This resulted in the 1970s stories featuring Superboy being set in the 1950s.

Starting with the debut in 1980 of a new Superboy comic, the Boy of Steel's era was moved up again, to take place in the late 1960s/early 1970s. This also explained Superman's shifting age within his own comic books.

Enemies of Superboy
In 1953, Mort Weisinger became the editor of Superboy and Adventure Comics, and under his guidance, Superboy began to acquire a regular cast of supervillains. Some of these villains first made their appearance in the Superboy feature, and would later go on to plague Superman.

Superboy first meets another human survivor of Krypton, Klax-Ar, a villain who claims he destroyed the planet, in Superboy #67 (1958). Three years later, both the Phantom Zone and its most infamous occupant, General Zod, make their first appearances in Adventure Comics #283 (1961), in a story that features Superboy accidentally trapping himself in the Phantom Zone after a cache of dangerous Kryptonian weapons arrives on Earth. Zod and other Phantom Zone villains would become recurring villains in Superboy stories, and go on to plague Superman.

The first Bizarro, in Superboy #68 (1958), is an imperfect copy of Superboy.

The Kryptonite Kid and his dog, aliens who could project Green Kryptonite radiation, start bedeviling Superboy and Krypto in 1960 (Superboy #83).

Superboy's cosmic heroics also earn him the enmity of an alien criminal task force, the Superboy Revenge Squad starting in Superboy #94 (1961). Two months later, the Revenge Squad started showing up in Superman stories.

Some of Superman's established foes were also backdated to his days as Superboy. Mister Mxyzptlk, the magical imp from the Fifth Dimension who had been Superman's bane since 1944, begins plaguing Superboy in Superboy #78 (1960).

The most famous example is the young Lex Luthor. In a story in Adventure Comics #271 (1960) that purported to reveal the origin of the enmity between Luthor and Superman, Lex is revealed as a brilliant Smallville teen who is a friend of Superboy until Lex blames him for a lab fire that destroys a critical experiment and causes Lex to lose his hair.

Superman's first encounters with his mineral nemesis, Kryptonite, were also backdated to his boyhood. The first Superboy story with Kryptonite, in Adventure Comics #171 (1951), followed the first Superman comic with Kryptonite by three years—and its use on the Superman radio show by eight years. Five years later, a Superbaby flashback in Adventure Comics #231 (1956) backdated Clark's first encounter with Kryptonite yet again.

Though Green Kryptonite, the type that can kill Superman, originally appeared in Superman stories, Red Kryptonite, whose temporary effects on Superman are unpredictable, made its first appearance in the Superboy story in Adventure Comics #252 (1958).

Legion of Super-Heroes

Unlike his adult self, Superboy inhabits a world that is (in his time) largely devoid of other superheroes.  Superboy occasionally meets heroes from other worlds, such as "Mars Boy", through both his visits to their worlds and their visits to Earth. Kal-El even meets time-traveling teen heroes of the future, including Robin and Supergirl.  Mostly, though, Superboy lacks superheroic peers with whom he could regularly interact.

In 1958, a Superboy story called "The Legion of Super-Heroes" in Adventure Comics #247 changed all that. The story features three super-powered teenagers from the 30th century who offer Superboy membership in their superhero club, the Legion of Super-Heroes. Although this was intended as a one-shot tale, the three future teens returned as guest stars in late 1959, and over the next three years, the Legion appeared periodically in Superboy, Supergirl (who also joined the Legion), and even Superman stories. The team membership also exploded from the initial three members to nearly twenty. Finally, the Legion got its own feature, starting in Adventure Comics #300 (1962), with Superboy usually, but not always, appearing as part of the team.

The popularity of the Legion of Super-Heroes soon rivaled that of Superboy himself. Nine issues after their feature debut, the Legion displaced Superboy as the lead feature in Adventure Comics, and soon forced original Superboy stories out altogether. Superboy's last consecutive original story in Adventure Comics #315 (1963) ended a run of 213 original Superboy features in the series.

Superboy still appeared in nearly every Legion story through Adventure Comics #380 (1969). In the next issue, the Legion was replaced by Supergirl, while the Legion (usually without Superboy) took over Supergirl's spot as the backup in Action Comics. In 1971, the Legion moved over to Superboy as a semi-regular backup. History repeated itself as the Legion backup feature quickly became more popular than the title feature. Beginning with Superboy #197 (1973), the cover logo was changed to read Superboy starring the Legion of Super-Heroes, and the Legion, including Superboy, took the lead spot in the comic.

The Superboy backup in #197 was the last original Superboy feature to appear in his own title. With the next issue, Superboy became an exclusively Legion of Super-Heroes title, with Superboy appearing in every issue as a Legion member. The series title remained Superboy through #230 (1977), after which the series became Superboy and the Legion of Super-Heroes from #231-258. With Legion of Super-Heroes (vol. 2) #259 (1980), an issue in which Superboy leaves the Legion, Superboy's name was ousted from the title altogether. Though he still sometimes appeared in the series that once bore his name, the series remained a Legion comic until its last issue, #354 (1987).

Later publishing history
After the Legion took over Superboy's own title, the solo Superboy feature itself was nearly moribund. For over three years, DC published no solo Superboy feature story.  Then the strip was revived for a stand-alone story in DC Super-Stars #12 (1977). Several months later, the Superboy feature returned to a regular publication schedule when the strip returned to its second home. Superboy headlined Adventure Comics for issues #453-458 (1977-1978), and then moved to The Superman Family, appearing in issues #191-198 (1978-1979). Finally, in late 1979, DC Comics gave Superboy his own comic again. The release of The New Adventures of Superboy #1 (January 1980) coincided with Superboy's (temporary) departure from the Legion in The Legion of Super-Heroes #259, as well as the one-shot Superboy Spectacular #1.

Much as Superboy's debut in Adventure Comics depicts Clark celebrating his tenth birthday, The New Adventures of Superboy #1 features Clark celebrating his sixteenth birthday and includes a flashback to Clark's first days as Superboy at the time of his eighth birthday. Later issues of the series continue themes from Superboy's earlier runs in Adventure Comics and Superboy. For example, Superboy first meets a teenage Hal Jordan (Green Lantern); his Earth-Two counterpart, Clark Kent (Kal-L) as a teen; and Toby Manning (the villain Terra-Man) as a boy in the Old West, all years after his first "adult" meetings with them were published. In a backup feature entitled "Superboy's Secret Diaries'", the new series also explored Clark's first couple years as Superboy. Another milestone for young Clark was the introduction of Lisa Davis, a romantic interest who was attracted solely to Clark Kent, with no idea whatsoever of his secret identity (as opposed to Lana Lang's on-again, off-again suspicions of a Clark-Superboy connection); the two would appear as a couple until the series' end. The New Adventures of Superboy lasted 54 issues, with the final issue published in 1984.

Superboy's life in college following his high school graduation and the deaths of his adoptive parents was explored in a backup feature called "Superman: The In-Between Years" that appeared in Superman in the early 1980s. This backup feature was followed by a 1985 four-issue miniseries called Superman: The Secret Years that examines Superboy's junior year, and how he starts calling himself Superman.

Following Crisis on Infinite Earths (1985-1986), The Man of Steel (1986) modified Superman's backstory so that he no longer had a history as Superboy, and never donned a costume until after he finished college. Because of the importance of Superboy to the history of the Legion of Super-Heroes, the 1987 storyline "The Greatest Hero of Them All" revealed that the Legion's Superboy came from a "pocket universe" created by the Legion foe the Time Trapper, rather than the main DC Universe. This version of Superboy dies after saving his parallel Earth.

Only one year after Superboy's comic-book "death", the live-action television series Superboy began its four-year broadcast. In late 1989, DC Comics began publishing a new Superboy comic book based on the TV series. As in the TV series, in the comic Clark Kent (Superboy) is in college, attending Shuster University in Florida. The new Superboy comic lasted 22 issues and one special, ceasing publication in 1992, just about the time the TV series itself came to an end.

Superman: Secret Origin

In recent years, particularly since the limited series Infinite Crisis concluded in 2006, Superman's backstory has been modified again, and many elements of Superboy's history have been restored to his biography. The limited series Superman: Secret Origin (2009-2010) fleshes out many of the details of Kal-El's revised backstory. The writer of the limited series, Geoff Johns, describes the story as follows: "It goes from Clark's teenage years, through his first adventure with the Legion of Super-Heroes and into his arrival and introduction to Metropolis as Superman. We've included the first three covers with the interview and you can see a pretty big part of Clark Kent's history is being reintroduced as well - namely, Superboy. But with a bit of a twist."

The first issue of the miniseries depicts teenage Clark first suiting up shortly after learning that he is from Krypton. In the second issue, Clark performs rescues and other super-feats in costume, but keeps his activities secret, giving rise to the myth of a "super-boy" operating in and around Smallville. He also joins the Legion of Super-Heroes under the identity of Superboy. Later in the same issue, Clark finds Krypto after the dog arrives on Earth. Clark does not go public with his superhero identity until after he has grown up and moved to Metropolis. Superboy (Kal-El) appeared in Adventure Comics from #12/#515 (August 2010) to #520 (January 2011) as a member of the Legion in the first story arc scripted by Paul Levitz in that series since its revival in 2009.

Writers and artists

Superboy/Superman's co-creator Joe Shuster had the initial responsibility for the artwork for the first couple years of the Superboy feature. Shuster himself pencilled the first story, and Shuster and artists from his studio pencilled and inked every story until 1947. The art graced stories written largely by Don Cameron, the author of the first Superboy story in More Fun Comics #101.

One of the artists from the Shuster studio, John Sikela, started drawing Superboy stories in late 1946, and in 1949, when Superboy #1 debuted, Sikela became DC's primary artist on Superboy, and he remained the primary artist until he retired in 1958. A frequent collaborator was fellow Shuster shop alumni Ed Dobrotka. Curt Swan, who would later dominate Superman artwork for nearly 30 years, first drew a Superboy story in Superboy #5 (1949) and would continue to draw Superboy stories, on and off, for twenty years. The primary Superman artist of the 1950s, Wayne Boring, also contributed to Superboy.

Cameron was the primary Superboy writer for the first few years after the character's debut. One of the earliest additional writers was Superboy/Superman co-creator Jerry Siegel, who wrote his first Superboy story in 1947 and would continue to contribute to the feature into the 1960s. Other early, notable Superboy writers included science fiction writer Edmond Hamilton  and Batman co-creator Bill Finger. Finger left a permanent impression on the Superboy mythos when, in just the course of a few months, he introduced readers to Superbaby and Lana Lang, in stories illustrated by Curt Swan and John Sikela, respectively.

Editorial guidance for the earliest Superboy stories was provided by Jack Schiff, one of Detective Comics' major editors in their early years, and he continued editing Superboy until 1953, when Mort Weisinger took over on both Superboy and Adventure Comics. Weisinger would later edit the entire Superman line. Over the course of the next few years, Weisinger brought in new writers and artists to work on Superboy. Perhaps the most significant new additions were writer Otto Binder, former Fawcett Comics and Marvel Family scripter, who started writing Superboy stories in 1954, and artist Al Plastino, who drew Superboy starting in 1957. Together, the two men wrote the story "The Legion of Super-Heroes" in Adventure Comics #247 (1958), giving birth to perhaps the most successful spinoff from the Superman family of comics. Three years earlier, Binder had also introduced Krypto in a story illustrated by Curt Swan.

When John Sikela retired in 1958, George Papp took over the lead artistic chores. The co-creator of Green Arrow (with Weisinger), one of Papp's stories involved Superboy meeting the young Green Arrow.  Though Otto Binder handled the most Superboy stories, writers contributing to Superboy during the Weisinger years included E. Nelson Bridwell, who also worked on Mad and created many DC characters, such as the Inferior Five, and Leo Dorfman.

In 1968, long-time DC editor Murray Boltinoff took over the editing chores on Superboy from Weisinger starting with issue #149. (By this time, Adventure Comics was no longer publishing original Superboy stories.) Stories published under his editorial guidance usually included credits, making writers and artists easier to track. Frank Robbins, best known for his work (as both writer and artist) on Batman, began writing the Superboy strip with Boltinoff's debut as editor, and remained the primary scripter for three years. Penciler Bob Brown began one issue later, and continued to pencil Superboy stories through the final Superboy feature in #197. Brown's pencils were inked by a number of artists, most notably Murphy Anderson from 1970 to 1973, who was simultaneously inking Curt Swan's pencils on Superman. After Robbins left, Leo Dorfman returned as the writer for Superboy, with occasional scripts by Bridwell and, toward the end, Cary Bates, later famous for his Superman stories. Boltinoff also made the editorial decision to switch the Legion backup feature from Action Comics to Superboy in 1971, and later to make the Legion feature the sole feature in the comic.

When The New Adventures of Superboy debuted in late 1979 under the guidance of Superman comics editor Julius Schwartz, Kurt Schaffenberger, perhaps most famous for his Lois Lane stories, became the main penciller, and contributed his artwork throughout the run of the series. Cary Bates returned to Superboy as the principal writer for the series for its first three years, with prolific DC writer Paul Kupperberg taking the scripting chores for the last third of the run. Bridwell and Bob Rozakis also contributed scripts. In addition, Rozakis wrote about Superboy's college years in the Superman backup series "Superman: The In-Between Years" in the early 1980s, with Schaffenberger providing the pencils; and the miniseries Superman: The Secret Years in 1984–1985, with Curt Swan providing the pencils and Schaffenberger, the inks.

The primary writer for the comic based on the Superboy television series was John Francis Moore, who also penned several screenplays for the TV series. Several other writers, including Kupperberg, also contributed. Experienced artist Jim Mooney (known for his work on Supergirl and Spider-Man) and Curt Swan split the pencilling chores for most of the series. Canadian artist Ty Templeton provided the majority of the inks.

Fictional character biography
Like most "ageless" or slowly aging comic book characters published over a span of decades, Superboy's fictional history was repeatedly modified in the forty years between the first Superboy feature and the Crisis on Infinite Earths. The final chapter in the story of the pre-Crisis Superboy, the tale of how Superboy becomes Superman, was being rewritten in the miniseries Superman: The Secret Years even as the first issues of Crisis went on sale. The synopsis below summarizes Superboy's fictional biography as it stood after the conclusion of the miniseries.

Kal-El comes to Earth
Superboy (Kal-El) is a native of the planet Krypton, the son of Jor-El, Krypton's most brilliant scientist and inventor, and his wife Lara. Finding evidence that the planet is about to be destroyed, Jor-El fails to convince the ruling Science Council, so he conducts tests with model rockets to enable his own family to escape. His tests meet with mixed success. In one experiment, Kal-El's pet dog Krypto is lost when a test rocket carrying Krypto is knocked off course by a meteor.

As Krypton's destruction approaches, Jor-El still has not built a rocket large enough to hold his family. With the planet coming apart beneath them, Jor-El and Lara put their two-year-old son in a model rocket, launch it just minutes ahead of Krypton's destruction, and send Kal-El to the planet Earth. Found by Jonathan and Martha Kent, an older couple with no children of their own, the child is anonymously left at a Smallville orphanage. Some days later, the Kents successfully adopt the toddler. They name the boy Clark Kent, using Martha's maiden name for his first name.

As related in Superbaby stories published over a span of over 30 years, the Kents face tremendous challenges raising their new child, because young Clark gains his full suite of superpowers as soon as he lands on Earth. Six years before Clark becomes Superboy, the Kents have the difficult task of teaching Clark to control the use of his powers. This proves especially challenging because "Superbaby" is inclined to use his powers to act on childish whims, whims that take him around the world, into space, and even into the past. Through his adoptive parents' patient guidance and a great deal of luck, Clark keeps his identity secret and learns to control his powers. As Clark grows up, Jonathan and Martha further instruct Clark to use his powers responsibly for the benefit of others, rather than to his own reward or power.

The Kents spend their first years with Clark on the Kent family farm. Within a few years of adopting Clark, the Kents sell the farm and move to the town of Smallville proper. Using the money from the sale of the farm, the Kents open a general store, a family business to which Clark will contribute when he is older. The Kents live at 321 Maple Drive, and Clark attends school with his peers, including neighbor Lana Lang. To help conceal his identity, Clark adopts a mild-mannered demeanor and wears glasses.

Clark becomes Superboy

 
On his eighth birthday, Clark dons an indestructible costume woven by Martha from the Kryptonian blankets that accompanied him on his journey to Earth. He becomes the costumed hero Superboy, the first superhero of Earth-One. Around the same time as his public debut, Superboy learns of his Kryptonian origin, and several weeks later, he gives reporter Perry White the exclusive story about his alien background. Though most of Superboy's early adventures occur in the vicinity of Smallville, he becomes famous for his superheroics around the globe. Superboy's status as both Smallville's hometown hero and as a national/global hero are reflected in the emergency-signal system that he establishes with Chief Parker of the Smallville Police and the President of the United States. As Superboy repeatedly ventures into interstellar space, his super-heroics also bring him fame on other worlds.

In Smallville, Superboy uses tunnels from the basement of the Kents' house and general store to make quick, concealed exits when Superboy is needed. Superboy also maintains a secret lab in the basement of the Kent house, where he builds Superboy and Clark Kent robots to cover for him when he is busy elsewhere or otherwise unavailable.

Clark's mild-mannered character gives him few friends as a boy, and makes him the target of bullies like Bash Bashford. For years, Clark's closest friend is his beautiful red-headed neighbor, Lana Lang.  Despite their friendship, Lana is also a major nuisance in Clark's life because of her recurring suspicion that Clark is secretly Superboy. Through clever use of his super-powers and robot duplicates of himself (in both identities), Clark is always able to avoid the traps Lana sets for him in order to determine the truth. For all that Lana's antics annoy Clark, as a teenager, Lana becomes Superboy's main romantic interest, and remains so through his years in high school.

As Superboy, Kal-El is the first of Earth's superheroes. Despite the occasional appearance of heroes like Aquaboy and the Japanese hero Sunburst,<ref name="nas45">The New Adventures of Superboy #45-47 (1983)</ref> Superboy is the only superhero who has a well-known public profile until after he becomes Superman. Superboy's solitary status is reduced somewhat when he is reunited with Krypto, infant Kal-El's pet dog on Krypton. Krypto joins Superboy in many of his subsequent adventures as his canine partner, and also has many adventures of his own. Through his discovery of the Phantom Zone, Superboy later finds out he is not the lone humanoid survivor of Krypton.

Superboy joins the Legion
Though Superboy encounters few super-powered peers on Earth, he occasionally befriends teens living on other worlds that have superpowers. Not until Cosmic Boy, Saturn Girl, and Lightning Lad come into the past to recruit him for the thirtieth-century Legion of Super-Heroes does Superboy find a group of super-powered friends with whom he regularly interacts. Superboy's career in fact is the inspiration for the formation of the Legion. Throughout his teenage years, Superboy travels to the future under his own power to join the Legion in fighting threats to Earth and the United Planets, to which Earth belongs. Superboy becomes a core member of the Legion during two extended, full membership stints in the Legion, including two terms as Deputy Leader. Through the Legion, Superboy also regularly meets with his cousin Kara, Supergirl, but because of telepathic hypnotism employed by Saturn Girl, Superboy never remembers Kara, or any other information relating to his future career as Superman or the future of his family and friends, when he returns to his normal, 20th-century era.

One of the youths who becomes a member of the Legion is Lar Gand, a teenager whom Superboy first knows as Mon-El when he crash-lands on Earth in Superboy's era. The teenager, who has powers identical to Superboy, initially has amnesia, and because he carries a message from Jor-El, Superboy believes him to be his big brother and dubs him Mon-El. When Mon-El is exposed to lead, his memory returns. He reveals that he is actually a Daxamite named Lar Gand, and for Daxamites, lead is more deadly than Kryptonite. To save his life, Superboy projects Mon-El into the Phantom Zone, where Mon-El would linger for a millennium before being freed by the Legion. In the Legion, the two teens remain close friends. The alternate Superboy from the Pocket Universe would die in Mon-El's arms.

Superboy meets Lex Luthor
Not long after he joins the Legion, Superboy's life is threatened when a Green Kryptonite meteor falls to Earth, but his life is saved by a Smallville farm boy named Lex Luthor, who also happens to be a science prodigy. The two boys become fast friends, and Superboy builds Lex a fully stocked laboratory to allow him to conduct his experiments. Lex uses the lab to search for a cure for Superboy's weakness to Kryptonite. Just after Lex discovers the cure, a fire breaks out in his lab. When Superboy puts out the fire, the antidote is destroyed, along with a protoplasmic life form that Lex created, and Lex also loses all his hair. Lex blames Superboy for destroying his experiment and his hair loss, accusing the Boy of Steel of jealousy over his brilliance. Lex swears that he will prove to the world that he is superior to Superboy. Lex does this by trying to implement a series of scientific quality-of-life improvements for Smallville's residents; however, each invention of Lex's winds up backfiring, requiring Superboy to intervene. This series of setbacks results in Lex dedicating his life to destroying Superboy. In the years that follow, Lex becomes Superboy's (and then Superman's) archfoe. Superboy soon acquires a small rogues gallery of recurring villains, including Lex.

Around the time Mon-El arrives on Earth, a boy named Pete Ross moves to Smallville. He quickly befriends Clark Kent, and the two boys are soon best friends. One night on a camping trip, Pete accidentally spies Clark changing into his Superboy outfit. Vowing to keep his knowledge a secret, Pete uses his knowledge to aid Superboy and on several occasions, save his life. Not until years after they have both grown up does Pete reveal his knowledge to Clark. Through the rest of his years in high school, Pete and Lana remain Clark's closest friends, and also share numerous adventures with Superboy both in the twentieth century and with the Legion in the thirtieth.

Superboy becomes Superman
Shortly after his graduation from high school, Superboy takes his adoptive parents on a holiday in the Caribbean where they contract a rare tropical disease. Though Superboy tries valiantly to save Martha and Jonathan, nothing cures their illness. With Clark by her side, Martha passes away. Just before he dies, Jonathan makes Clark promise to use his powers only for good. In mourning, Clark buries his parents. Shortly thereafter, Superboy leaves Smallville, though not before throwing the townsfolk a giant farewell party that he tops off with a giant cake. Separately, Clark departs for Metropolis to attend Metropolis University.

In Metropolis, Clark readily befriends the students who share his dorm suite, Tommy Lee, Dave Hammond and the alcoholic Ducky Ginsberg. Superboy soon reveals himself as the new guardian of Metropolis, ending a national guessing game about which city Superboy would call his new home. For Clark's first two years at Metropolis University, Lana is also a classmate, before she transfers to Hudson University.

In his junior year, Superboy again feels helpless when he isn't present to stop an automobile accident involving Ducky, caused by his own drunk driving. Ducky is paralyzed for life and thereafter uses a wheelchair. Ducky's place in the dorm is taken by Billy Kramer, a Smallville boy whom Clark befriends and decides to trust with his secret. Much as Superman would later do for Jimmy Olsen, Superboy gives Billy a supersonic whistle that he can use to call Superboy for help when needed. While he is befriending Billy, Clark becomes romantically involved with a wheelchair-using student named Lori Lemaris. He eventually proposes to her, but Lori reveals she already learned his identity telepathically. She rejects his proposal because she is a mermaid from Atlantis.Superman: The Secret Years #2 (1985)

Trapped in a burning building while attempting to save a life, Billy uses his supersonic whistle to call Superboy, but Superboy, preoccupied with saving a thousand people on a Pacific island from a tsunami, is unable to reach him in time. Upset by his inability to save his parents and friends, Superboy exiles himself until, three months later, Perry White, using Billy's whistle, calls him back into action to battle Lex Luthor.  After defeating Luthor, Clark makes peace with his limitations and returns to Metropolis for his final year of college. Now 21, Kal-El starts calling himself Superman, 13 years after his debut as Superboy.

Post-Infinite Crisis
In current mainstream DC continuity, Superman does not begin his public superhero career until adulthood. However, as a teenager he joins the Legion of Super-Heroes, and used the name "Superboy" while visiting the 31st century. Thus, most of Kal-El's pre-Crisis on Infinite Earths stories with the Legion are once again considered canonical. In addition, Clark wears his Superboy outfit when he works as a clandestine superhero in and around Smallville.

Powers, abilities, and equipment
Superboy has the same powers and abilities of Superman, including superhuman strength, superspeed, heat vision, X-ray vision, telescopic and microscopic vision, flight, invulnerability, and super-speed sufficient to travel through both interstellar space and time. Kal-El would not build his Fortress of Solitude until he becomes Superman, so Superboy uses the Kent house in Smallville as a base. Superboy's well-stocked secret laboratory in the Kent basement is where he stores several devices invented by his Kryptonian father Jor-El, including the Phantom Zone projector. A tunnel leading to the outskirts of Smallville allows Superboy to leave the Kent house (as Superboy) unobserved. Though they are not as powerful as Superboy himself, Superboy's robot duplicates possess his powers, enabling them to make convincing substitutes for him when necessary. The Clark Kent robot performs the same function for Kal-El's other identity.

Superboy wears a Legion flight ring to signify his membership in the Legion of Super-Heroes, and for its communication function (allowing him to converse with other Legionnaires in the vacuum of outer space).

Other versions

Like Superman, Superboy appeared as a character in "imaginary stories" during the Silver and Bronze Ages of Comics. These included stories in which Bruce Wayne comes to live with the Kents after his parents are killed; baby Kal-El is raised by gorillas under the name "Karkan", in a tale that resembles the story of Tarzan; and Kara Zor-El comes to Earth years ahead of Kal-El, becoming Superwoman to his Superboy (portrayed in this story as a juvenile delinquent).

Kal-El has also appeared as Superboy in two popular Elseworlds tales: Superboy's Legion (2001), in which Kal is raised in the 31st century by R. J. Brande and becomes a founding member of "Superboy's Legion", later known as the Legion of Super-Heroes; and the Superman & Batman: Generations series of stories, in which Superman gets his start as Superboy during the 1920s.

Legal status

The Superboy character is currently the subject of a legal battle between Time Warner, the owner of DC Comics, and the heirs of Jerry Siegel. The Siegel estate claims that the original "Superboy" character published by DC Comics is an independent creation that used ideas from Jerry Siegel's original rejected pitch and was created without his consent. On April 4, 2006, Federal judge Ronald S. W. Lew issued a summary judgment ruling that Jerry Siegel's heirs had the right to revoke their copyright assignment to Superboy and had successfully reclaimed the trademark to the name as of November 17, 2004. This legal battle is still ongoing.

In April 2013, federal judge Otis Wright ruled that DC Comics (and its parent Time Warner) owned the rights to the Superboy character, apparently clearing the way for the company to produce new works featuring the adolescent Clark Kent as "Superboy," if it so wished. However, the Siegel heirs indicated they would continue appeals.

In other media

Superboy has made the transition to television several times, most notably in the television series Superboy (1988-1992), about Clark during his college days.

Many elements of the Superboy stories have also been incorporated into the TV series Smallville'' (2001-2011), including characters such as Lana Lang and Pete Ross; the story arc of how close friends Clark Kent and Lex Luthor become bitter enemies; the motif of Clark first meeting many of Superman's friends and foes while still a teenager; and the town of Smallville itself.

References

Comics characters introduced in 1945
Kryptonians
DC Comics characters with superhuman strength
DC Comics characters who can move at superhuman speeds
DC Comics characters with accelerated healing
DC Comics characters with superhuman senses
DC Comics aliens
DC Comics extraterrestrial superheroes
DC Comics male superheroes
DC Comics child superheroes
DC Comics orphans
Characters created by Jerry Siegel
Characters created by Joe Shuster
Fictional characters with absorption or parasitic abilities
Fictional characters with air or wind abilities
Fictional characters with energy-manipulation abilities
Fictional characters with fire or heat abilities
Fictional characters with ice or cold abilities
Fictional characters with nuclear or radiation abilities
Fictional characters with slowed ageing
Fictional characters with superhuman durability or invulnerability
Fictional characters with X-ray vision
Superheroes who are adopted
Superman characters
Superboy
Teenage superheroes